Martin Schlaff (born 6 August 1953) is an Austrian businessman. He was occupied in trade with East Germany before the German reunification. According to investigations by the German parliament, Schlaff was an unofficial employee of the Stasi. His Stasi codename was "Landgraf" and registration number "3886-86". His net worth is estimated over €8 billion.

Career with East Germany
Schlaff was born in Vienna, Austria, to Jewish refugees from World War II. He and his brother James took over the commercial firm Robert Placzek AG.

The Stasi archives have files about him as early as 1982. Schlaff had several meetings with East German officials in 1982. Stasi documents describe how senior Stasi officers were impressed with Schlaff's "extensive holdings, his various companies, and his access to the needed American technology".

According to the German parliament's investigations, Schlaff supplied East Germany with goods that were embargoed by the West.

Disappeared public funds after the Fall of the Berlin Wall
When the parliament of Germany investigated public funds that disappeared after the Fall of the Berlin Wall, it found out that East Germany (GDR) had transferred large amounts of money to Schlaff through accounts in Vaduz, the capital of Liechtenstein, in return for goods "under Western embargo".
Moreover, high-ranking Stasi officers continued their post-GDR careers in management positions in Schlaff's group of companies. For example, in 1990 Herbert Kohler, Stasi commander in Dresden, transferred 170 million marks to Schlaff for "harddisks" and months later went to work for him.
The investigations concluded that "Schlaff's empire of companies played a crucial role" in the Stasi attempts to secure the financial future of Stasi agents and keep the intelligence network alive.

The Stern magazine noted that KGB officer Vladimir Putin (now President of Russia) worked with his Stasi colleagues in Dresden simultaneously.

Recent activities

In recent years he has purchased mobile phone companies in Eastern Europe and resold them for big profits.

In 2010 he established a bank in Liechtenstein called Sigma Bank.

In March 2008, The Sunday Times reported that Schlaff's 2007 divorce from his wife Andrea involved a €200 million settlement, the largest ever reported up to that time.

Links to Gazprom and Russia

Schlaff has links to Gazprom companies. His confidant Michael Hason holds positions in the Centrex Group, a network of companies controlled by Gazprom. Hason was also president of the Liechtenstein-registered CAP Holding, which holds shares in the Jericho casino for Schlaff and his partners. According to Haaretz, "Hason in fact holds positions in all the companies to which Schlaff is connected: the Robert Placzek lumber trade company, various cell-phone firms, the private family foundation MS Privatstiftung, the Latvian oil company, of which Schlaff is a partner, and more. And several months ago, Schlaff appointed him deputy chairman of Sygma Bank, which he established in Liechtenstein."

Schlaff also owns a company in Cyprus which is registered at the same address as Centrex Holding and shares some directors with Gazprom companies. Schlaff, Centrex, and Robert Nowikovsky share the same press officer in Vienna.
Nowikovsky is involved with Centrex Group and a director of Central Energy Italian Gas Holding, a company which was found to secretly benefit Bruno Mentasti-Granelli, a friend of Silvio Berlusconi, in an Italian-Russian gas deal.

British Gas project
A co-owner of East Mediterranean Gas Company claimed that the off-shore Gaza gas fields project, owned mostly by British Gas, had shares held confidentially in trust for various people including Schlaff and Palestinian businessman Muhammad Rashid.

Activities in Israel
In 1998 Schlaff opened a casino in Jericho in partnership with a company partly owned by Yasir Arafat. Named "The Oasis", it was aimed at Israelis, who could not gamble in Israel where gaming is not legal. The casino was closed during the Second Intifada.

According to later investigations, Schlaff had many meetings with Ariel Sharon.
In 2002 Schlaff used his contacts with Sharon to help normalize the Austrian Federal Government's relations with Israel. The Israeli Government had recalled its ambassador from Vienna, after government participation of the FPÖ in 2000. A new Israeli ambassador was sent to Austria in 2004.

In December 2005 Israeli police raided Schlaff's apartment and announced that they had found evidence of a 3 million dollar bribe. Within 24 hours Sharon suffered a stroke and went into a coma, never recovering.

Schlaff's partner Robert Nowikovsky has also been investigated.
An investigative exposé in Ha'aretz "targeting Avigdor Lieberman, unearthed connections between the financier of the corruption-laden Oasis Casino in Jericho and Prime Minister Ehud Olmert and his predecessor Ariel Sharon." Police alleged that Sharon had received a $3 million bribe, and Lieberman is still under investigation for allegedly receiving a bribe from Schlaff.

According to Ha'aretz, "The $3 million that parachuted into Gilad and Omri Sharon's bank account toward the end of 2002 was transferred there in the context of a consultancy contract for development of kolkhozes (collective farms) in Russia. Gilad Sharon was brought into the campaign to make the wilderness bloom in Russia by Getex, a large Russian-based exporter of seeds (peas, millet, wheat ) from Eastern Europe. Getex also has ties with Israeli firms involved in exporting wheat from Ukraine, for example. The company owns farms in Eastern Europe and is considered large and prominent in its field. It has its Vienna offices in the same building as Jurimex, which was behind the $1-million guarantee to the Yisrael Beiteinu party." Schlaff activities seem to be related to Getex.

In June 2010 Schlaff's NYC business partner, Solomon Obstfeld, who ran LH Financial, was found dead in an apparent suicide or murder.

In September 2010 journalist Gidi Weitz published an investigative story in Ha'aretz on Schlaff's allegedly corrupt and illegal activities, both financial and political, in several countries including Austria and Israel.

In April 2011, the Israeli foreign minister, Avigdor Lieberman, was put under investigation after being accused of receiving bribes from Martin Schlaff among other businessmen.

See also
 Sokratis Kokkalis - Another billionaire who worked for the Stasi according to the Stasi archive

References

1953 births
Living people
Austrian billionaires
Austrian chief executives
Austrian expatriates in Israel
Austrian Jews
Businesspeople from Vienna
People of the Stasi